Agonidium rugosicolle is a species of ground beetle in the subfamily Platyninae. It was described by Gemminger & Harold in 1868.

References

rugosicolle
Beetles described in 1868